The 1944 United States presidential election in New Mexico took place on November 7, 1944. All forty-eight contemporary States were part of the 1944 United States presidential election. State voters chose four electors to represent them in the Electoral College, which voted for President and Vice President. A larger relative population in New Mexico increased the number of presidential electors from the state to four, from three in the previous election cycle.

New Mexico was won by incumbent President Franklin D. Roosevelt, against Governor of New York Thomas E. Dewey, who was making his first bid for the presidency.

Results

Results by county

References

New Mexico
1944 New Mexico elections
1944